Founded by Safi A. Thomas, The Hip-Hop Dance Conservatory (abbreviated as "H+") is a multi-platformed, non-governmental organization (NGO) with consultative status on the Economic and Social Council (ECOSOC) of the United Nations with the mission to preserve, evolve, and proliferate the art form of Hip-Hop Dance (foundations: Popping, Boogaloo, Locking, Rocking, Breaking, and Party Dance) in the US and abroad through its six foundational pillars: Pedagogy, Repertory, Advocacy, Medical Research, Infrastructure, and Design. Signified by the acronym, PYRAMID®, these pillars are designed under the premise that every artist is a human first. This artist cannot thrive at their greatest potential if their basic human needs are not being met consistently. In turn, each pillar was carefully chosen to address the needs of the culture and community of Hip-Hop, which are in many ways reflective of the needs of the overarching arts infrastructure in the United States.

Baya Voce from The Real World: Brooklyn auditioned for the conservatory during the filming of the show in 2008. Her audition and acceptance call from Thomas was later shown on television when the series aired in 2009. She declined the offer, stating the strict military-style teaching style of Thomas was the reason.

References

External links
 Hip-Hop Dance Conservatory
 

Dance schools in the United States
Hip hop dance
Dance in New York City
Universities and colleges in Manhattan